Fort Ti is a 1953 American 3-D Western film directed by William Castle, and starring George Montgomery and Joan Vohs. Written by Robert E. Kent, the film is the first Western to be released in 3-D and the first 3-D feature to be released in Technicolor by a major studio.  Fort Ti was distributed by Columbia Pictures in the United States.

The film is set in 1759 at Fort Ticonderoga during the French and Indian War.

Premise
As war is raging across 18th-century colonial America, a band of famed native fighters join British forces for an assault on a French stronghold.

Cast
 George Montgomery as Capt. Jedediah Horn 
 Joan Vohs as Fortune Mallory
 Irving Bacon as Sgt. Monday Wash
 James Seay as Mark Chesney 
 Ben Astar as François Leroy 
 Phyllis Fowler as Running Otter 
 Howard Petrie as Maj. Robert Rogers
 Cicely Browne as Bess Chesney
 Lester Matthews as Lord Jeffery Amherst
 George Leigh as Capt. Delecroix
 Louis Merrill as Raoul de Moreau
 Rusty Hamer as Jed's nephew (uncredited)

Production
William Castle says Sam Katzman was inspired to make the film by the success of Bwana Devil. Castle says he "decided to throw every goddamn thing I could think of at the camera" in the movie.

3-D supervision was by M.L. Gunzburg, creator of the Natural Vision 3-D system that had initiated the 3-D boom, previously used on Bwana Devil and House of Wax. The film was shot at Columbia Studios and on location in Utah and Southern California.

Box office
Fort Ti earned an estimated $2.6 million domestically during its first year of release.

Legacy
In 1982, Fort Ti became the first 3-D film to be broadcast on television in the United Kingdom. The following year, it became the first 3-D film to be broadcast on television in the United States along with the Three Stooges 3-D short Pardon My Backfire.

References

External links
 
 
 Fort Ti  at American Film Institute
 Review of film at Variety

1953 films
1953 Western (genre) films
Films set in 1759
1953 3D films
American Western (genre) films
Columbia Pictures films
Films directed by William Castle
Films set in New York (state)
Films set in the Thirteen Colonies
Films shot in California
Films shot in Utah
French and Indian War films
American historical adventure films
1950s historical adventure films
American 3D films
1950s English-language films
1950s American films